Hillcrest Heights may refer to places in the United States:

Hillcrest Heights, Florida
Hillcrest Heights, Maryland